Oslon is a commune in the Saône-et-Loire department in the region of Bourgogne-Franche-Comté in eastern France.

History
The village was founded circa 1850 when the French postal services installed a forepost alongside the railroad. Previously the region had been populated by diverse immigration which started under the Roman Empire, which had a great commercial route (the Appian Way) and stopover a few miles away in the city of Autun.

Oslon was the first city where the fighters of the Resistance went when they entered the free zone after the German invasion of France during World War II. The Germans stopped just outside Chalon-sur-Saône. Many Frenchmen died trying to swim across to Oslon and the free zone.

Specialties of the area
The Burgundy "Bresse" area, which starts at Oslon and finishes north and east of Lyon, is famous as the prime area for escargot.  It also produces good wines.

People
The most famous people from the village are Nicephore Niepce, who invented modern photography, and the tycoon family which created Rhone-Poulenc, the French Fortune 200 conglomerate.

See also
Communes of the Saône-et-Loire department

References

Communes of Saône-et-Loire